Cancer, There Is Hope is a bronze sculpture by Victor Salmones, formerly installed in Houston, Texas, United States. It was cast in 1990, shortly after the artist's death, and was dedicated on May 16, 1993. The sculpture was presented to the City of Houston by the Richard and Annette Bloch Foundation.

There are plans to remove the sculpture, as of 2021, because of vandalism beyond repair.

See also

 1990 in art
 List of public art in Houston

References

1990s establishments in Texas
1990 sculptures
Bronze sculptures in Texas
Destroyed sculptures
Outdoor sculptures in Houston
Sculptures of children in the United States
Sculptures of men in Texas
Sculptures of women in Texas
Statues in Houston
Vandalized works of art in Texas